The River Crane, a tributary of the River Thames, runs 8.5 miles (13.6 km) in West London, England. It forms the lower course of Yeading Brook. It adjoins or passes through three London boroughs: Hillingdon, Hounslow and Richmond upon Thames, in the historic county of Middlesex. The drainage basin is heavily urbanised but many of the Hayes to Whitton flood-meadows have been conserved, forming a narrow, green vale, opening out to what remains of Hounslow Heath in the centrea near-continuous belt of semi-natural habitat.

At the start of the twentieth century several small sewage works discharged to the river. However these have been consolidated with others into one (Mogden Sewage Treatment Works) which discharges directly to the upper estuary of the Thames (the Tideway).

The Crane's form has been greatly altered by river engineering works: over centuries the watercourse has been subject to widening, narrowing, straightening, dredging and bank reinforcement. The greatest of such works has been the two-phase construction of the Duke of Northumberland's River (DNR), a tributary and distributary, to guarantee water power to mills, now demolished, across the south and southeast of Isleworth, which in latter decades worked calico cloth as well as grain. The Lower DNR also waters the grand fish pond inherited from Syon Abbey, which gave way in the dissolution of the monasteries to Syon House and Syon Park. The semi-private park, with its scenic tea room, garden centre and hotel, has a nature reserve zone alongside the Thames. Its lake is still refreshed via sluice and culvert from the Lower DNR's Mill Plat, and thus is supplied by virtue of the Crane from the Colne and the Yeading Brook. The latter means the river system has sources in the London Boroughs of Harrow and Ealing [in Southall as an overflow offtake from the Paddington Arm of the Grand Union Canal].

Location
The Crane has always been so marked in maps of Cranford, rather than as the Yeading Brook. Here the east end of North Hyde Road in the far south-east of Hayes has a bridge which is on the boundary between the two districts (and the traditional parishes), from where its course is nearly semi-circular to the south then east, joining the tidal Thames at the boundary of St Margarets and Isleworth, just to the south of Isleworth Ait.

Passing through Cranford, the river crosses Cranford Countryside Park, skirts the eastern side of Heathrow Airport's car parks (formerly the Cranford Heath part of Hounslow Heath) and North Feltham, the latter split from Hounslow West on the other bank by most of what is left of Hounslow Heath; here the (Upper) Duke of Northumberland's River joins the Crane. From this point, the Crane turns gradually east and passes through Crane Park, Twickenham. In Crane Park is the site of the Hounslow Powder Mills which were built in the 16th century and continued to make gunpowder until 1927. The mills have disappeared, but the Shot Tower still stands nearby. The large millpool on an island above the mills is now a Local Nature Reserve, Crane Park Island. A distributary splits off (forming a second section of the Duke's River) at Kneller Gardens. The Crane itself flows north east through central Twickenham and then north through the Cole Park area. The river is tidal in the final stretch between Cole Park Island and the confluence with the Thames. The Lower Duke's River is tidal for the short distance below the weir by the bridge in Church Street, Isleworth, to its confluence with the Thames. Upstream in Isleworth it has been diverted to flow through Mogden Sewage Treatment Works, where it provides coolant for the power station. Treated sewage effluent from the works is not discharged here but is instead piped to the Tideway (upper estuary of the Thames) at Isleworth Ait.

The Crane in major part delimits the London boroughs of 
Hillingdon and Hounslow. 
Hounslow and "Richmond".

When extending the Piccadilly line from Hounslow West to Heathrow Airport, the high water table of the ground beneath the Crane made it impractical to tunnel under the river channel, so the lines briefly emerge from their tunnels here and cross over the watercourse via a bridge.

Etymology
Its name is interwoven with Cranford and may be from crane (bird)s.

Associated watercourses
 The Yeading Brook system forms the Crane's headwaters. There are two branches, the Yeading Brook West and Yeading Brook East, both of which arise in the London Borough of Harrow. They merge just south of the A40 in the London Borough of Hillingdon. The Yeading Brook becomes the River Crane in the stretch between Minet Country Park and Cranford Country Park. Before the 19th century the Yeading Brook was also referred to as the Fish Bourne or Fishbourne.
 Duke of Northumberland's River: this man-made river has two distinct sections, constructed at different times. The Upper DNR is purely a tributary of the Crane and a distributary of the Colne. It taps the Colne at Longford; it feeds the Crane at the far west of Hounslow. The Lower DNR is a distributary of the Crane, flowing from the diffluence at Whitton to the upper estuary of the Thames (the Tideway) in the adjoining parish and former manor of Isleworth. 
 Frogs Ditch flows from south west Hayes, crossing under the M4 motorway before running along the western and southern boundaries of Cranford Countryside Park to feed the Crane immediately upstream of the Cranford Lane road bridge at the southern end of the park.
 The Whitton Brook flows into the River Crane at the Cole Park Allotments site.

Definitive Crane reaches
The inset map shows in highlighted blue the quite steady slope used for General Roy's baseline, used for the Anglo-French Survey (1784–1790), starting the first exact co-ordinating of two premier European observatories. It supposedly had about a millimetre of error per kilometre, by the mid-19th century shown to be a few centimetres. To the east of this it shows the definitive reaches of the Crane.

Pollution incidents

2011
From 29 to 31 October 2011, about one day of the Heathrow zone's raw sewage was, due to a valve jam, diverted into the Crane. A two-metre inter-pipe valve jammed shut on Saturday morning at Cranford Bridge on the A4 Bath Road while Thames Water engineers carried out routine maintenance. Unable to force it back open, they arranged for the backed-up sewage to be taken away in tanker lorries for treatment. The volume of sewage meant tanker removal could not keep pace. Faced with a choice between letting the excess sewage back up into basements of Bath Road hotels and various airport roads or spill to the Crane, the much cheaper option prevailed, resulting in discharge until 3am on Monday and damaged wildlife. This killed 3,000 fish.

2013
On 4 October 2013, a major local newspaper group covered an ongoing incident:

Three days later, a temporary coffer dam of sandbags spanned the river, just north of the Piccadilly Line bridge. A bulk road tanker with flexible hoses extracted polluted water above this.

The Crane Valley Partnership later noted that the EA traced the source to a fractured main (probably caused by illegal ground works) of sewage sludge between the Mogden works and Iver; escaping sludge drained away via legitimate surface water drains.

Catchment partnership
The Crane Valley Partnership (CVP) is the relevant 'Catchment Based Approach' (CaBA) catchment partnership. It strategises and co-ordinates efforts to manage and improve the Crane and its tributaries, including enhancing biodiversity, water quality and quantity, connectivity, public access, community cohesion, and historical and educational opportunities.

It stemmed from the West London Biodiversity Practitioners Group, derived from the partnerships of the Hounslow Local Biodiversity Action Plan. The Group held its first meeting on 13 November 2002, at Heathrow's "Mayfield Farm" classroom. The original members included:
teams from the London Boroughs of Hounslow and Hillingdon, Groundwork Thames Valley, Syon Park Estate, Thames Water, Heathrow Airport Ltd,
Glendale/British Airways, English Nature, London Wildlife Trust (LWT), Royal Society for the Protection of Birds (RSPB).
 
The main objective of the Group was to encourage local conservation work. The Group reconvened the next February and July. The partnership then evolved to become the River Crane Management Forum (RCMF), which had its first meeting the next June. Members present were: 
Environment Agency (EA)
Greater London Authority (GLA)
Heathrow Airport Landside Property Services
A Rocha, WSP for the above, Penny Anderson Associates.
Glendale for Heathrow Airport Landside Property Services
London Borough of Hounslow
London Wildlife Trust
Friends of the River Crane Environment (FORCE)
London Borough of Hillingdon
London Borough of Ealing
 
These agreed an aspiration for joined-up action along the Crane to improve water quality and biodiversity, as well as promoting the significance of the river corridor as part of the West London Green Chain. The Forum had another meeting on 20 July 2005, when the CVP was established. Up until 2021 its meetings were customarily hosted and chaired by an educational charity:
Green Corridor

In April 2013, the Partnership appointed a Development Manager employed through this charity, initially utilising a sum of £400,000 provided by Thames Water following the 2011 incident. More recently CVP's staffing/administration costs have been met by annual contributions from a number of the partner organisations including Thames Water.

In 2021 the hosting/chairing service was taken on by the Crane Valley Community Interest Company, specifically set up for this purpose.

CVP is formed of five London boroughs and public, voluntary and private stakeholders, working towards a shared vision: for a well-managed and high quality river corridor which is accessible to all, in which wildlife can thrive and local people can take pride and ownership.

See also
Tributaries of the River Thames
List of rivers in England

Notes and references
Footnotes

Citations

External links
 Crane Valley Partnership
 London Biodiversity Audit includes "The Tidal Thames" — from which part of the information in this article is taken
 Environment Agency Flood Report: upper Crane
 Environment Agency Flood Report: lower Crane
 Friends of the River Crane Environment
 Thames Anglers Conservancy

Crane
Crane
Parks and open spaces in the London Borough of Hounslow
Crane
Crane
 
St Margarets, London